Donna Whitley Martin is a United States Army lieutenant general serving as the Inspector General of the United States Army since September 2, 2021. She is the first female Inspector General of the Army. She most recently served as the 18th United States Army Provost Marshal General / Commanding General, United States Army Criminal Investigation Command, from July 2020 to August 5, 2021. She previously served as commanding general of the United States Army Maneuver Support Center of Excellence and Fort Leonard Wood, and prior to that was commandant of the United States Military Police School from July 2017 to August 2018 and deputy commanding general of the United States Army Recruiting Command from March 2015 to July 2017.

In June 2021, she was nominated for promotion to lieutenant general, to the Office of the Inspector General of the United States Army. Martin was replaced as provost marshal general by her deputy, Brigadier General Duane R. Miller on August 5, 2021.

Awards and decorations

References

Year of birth missing (living people)
Living people
Old Dominion University alumni
United States Army War College alumni
People from Yorktown, Virginia
Female generals of the United States Army
United States Army Provost Marshal Generals
United States Army generals
Inspectors General of the United States Army
21st-century American women